John P. Williams may refer to:
 John P. Williams Jr., American businessperson
 John Patrick Williams (born 1937), American politician
 John Pugh Williams ( – 1803), American militia officer and politician

See also 
 John Williams (disambiguation)